The Karnataka women's cricket team is an Indian domestic cricket team representing the Indian state of Karnataka. The team has represented the state in Women's Senior One Day Trophy (List A) and  Senior women's T20 league.

Current squad
Satheesh Shubha
Vellaswamy Vanitha
Gnanananda Divya
Veda Krishnamurthy
Krishnappa Rakshitha (c)
Niki Prasad
Akanksha Kohli
Kumar Prathyoosha (wk)
Sahana Pawar
Rajeshwari Gayakwad
V Chandu

Honours
 Women's Senior One Day Trophy:
 Runners-up (1): 2021–22
 Women's Senior T20 Trophy:
 Runners-up (1): 2018–19

References

Women's cricket teams in India
Cricket in Karnataka